The 12th National Congress of the Kuomintang was the twelfth national congress of the Kuomintang, held on 29 March – 4 April 1981 in Chung-Shan Building, Beitou District, Taipei, Taiwan.

Results
Important resolutions passed were the "Unify China with the Three Principles of the People" and Chiang Ching-kuo reelection as Chairman of the Kuomintang.

See also
 Kuomintang

References

1981 conferences
1981 in Taiwan
National Congresses of the Kuomintang
Politics of Taiwan